Timeline of computing presents events in the history of computing organized by year and grouped into six topic areas: predictions and concepts, first use and inventions, hardware systems and processors, operating systems, programming languages, and new application areas.

Detailed computing timelines: before 1950, 1950–1979, 1980–1989, 1990–1999, 2000-2009, 2010-2019, 2020–present



Graphical timeline

See also
 History of compiler construction
 History of computing hardware – up to third generation (1960s)
 History of computing hardware (1960s–present) – third generation and later
 History of the graphical user interface
 History of the Internet
 History of the World Wide Web
 List of pioneers in computer science
 Timeline of electrical and electronic engineering
 Microprocessor chronology

Resources
 Stephen White, A Brief History of Computing
 The Computer History in time and space, Graphing Project, an attempt to build a graphical image of computer history, in particular operating systems.

External links
 Visual History of Computing 1944-2013 (archived)

 

Digital Revolution